Loxodonta adaurora is an extinct species of elephant in the genus  Loxodonta, that of the African elephants. Fossils of Loxodonta adaurora have only been found in Africa, where they developed in the Pliocene. L. adaurora was presumed to be the genetic antecedent of the two modern African elephant species; however, an analysis in 2009 suggested that L. africana evolved from L. atlantica. The same study concluded that Loxodonta adaurora was morphologically indistinguishable from Mammuthus subplanifrons and that these constituted the same species.

References

Prehistoric elephants
Pliocene proboscideans
Pleistocene species extinctions
Pliocene mammals of Africa
Fossil taxa described in 1970